Hamed Khosravi (born August 25, 1992 in Tabriz, Iran) is a retired  Iranian football midfielder, who currently plays for Esteghlal in Iran's Premier Football League.

Club career

Club career statistics

 Assist Goals

References

External links
 Hamed Khosravi at Persian League

Iranian footballers
Living people
Steel Azin F.C. players
Shahrdari Tabriz players
Esteghlal F.C. players
1992 births
Association football midfielders